Terrence Robert "Terry" Forman (born 12 January 1948) was a rugby union player who represented Australia.

Forman, a wing, claimed a total of 7 international rugby caps for Australia.

References

Australian rugby union players
Australia international rugby union players
1948 births
Living people
Rugby union wings